40 Greatest Hits may refer to:

 40 Greatest Hits (Hank Williams album), 1978
 40 Greatest Hits (Perry Como album), 1975